Cullomburg is a census-designated place and unincorporated community in Choctaw and Washington counties, Alabama, United States. Its population was 126 as of the 2020 census.

Demographics

Note: the US Census treats Hispanic/Latino as an ethnic category. This table excludes Latinos from the racial categories and assigns them to a separate category. Hispanics/Latinos can be of any race.

References

Census-designated places in Alabama
Unincorporated communities in Alabama